Athiasella is a genus of mites in the family Ologamasidae. There are about 18 described species in Athiasella.

Species
These 18 species belong to the genus Athiasella:

 Athiasella australica (Womersley, 1942)
 Athiasella biconi Karg, 1993
 Athiasella caverna Halliday, 2001
 Athiasella coniuncta Karg, 1993
 Athiasella dentata (Womersley, 1942)
 Athiasella goei (Lee, 1970)
 Athiasella hami Karg, 1993
 Athiasella longiseta Lee & Hunter, 1974
 Athiasella markmitchelli (Lee, 1970)
 Athiasella pecten Lee & Hunter, 1974
 Athiasella relata (Womersley, 1942)
 Athiasella relicta (Womersley, 1942)
 Athiasella scaphosternum Lee & Hunter, 1974
 Athiasella sellaris Karg, 1996
 Athiasella stefani Halliday, 2001
 Athiasella tridentata (Karg, 1976)
 Athiasella tuberculata Karg, 1993
 Athiasella viripileus Lee & Hunter, 1974

References

Ologamasidae